El Queremal is a town in the Dagua municipality, Valle del Cauca Department, Colombia. The town is accessible from Cali from several roads leading away from the main Cali-Buenaventura Road near the area of Kilometer 18, Valle del Cauca.

This climate is possible because of the convergence of moist air of the Pacific with the  Western Andes. The San Juan River runs through the area, beginning in the Farallones de Cali and flowing into the Dagua River, which is part of the greater Anchicayá River drainage.

The name "El Queremal" comes from the local plant Cavendishia quereme.

See also
 Andean Region, Colombia

Populated places in the Valle del Cauca Department